Sound Garden is an outdoor 2010 stainless steel sculpture by Lee Kelly, installed at the intersection of Reed Market Road and Mt. Bachelor Drive in Bend, Oregon, United States. The artwork was acquired by the non-profit organization Art in Public Places, and has been described as a "representation of organic musical notes rising above native plants and trees".

See also

 2010 in art
 List of public art in Bend, Oregon
 List of works by Lee Kelly

References

2010 establishments in Oregon
2010 sculptures
Buildings and structures in Bend, Oregon
Outdoor sculptures in Oregon
Stainless steel sculptures in Oregon